Kottukadu is a small town situated in the Chavara panchayath. Kottukadu Muslim jamaathu is the second most populated jamaath in Kollam district, village is part of the karunagappally taluk and chavara assembly constituency.

References

Villages in Kollam district